Evangelical Presbyterian College of Education, Amedzofe is a teacher education college in Amedzofe (Ho West District, Volta Region, Ghana). The college is located in Volta Zone. It is one of 46 public colleges of education in Ghana. The college participated in the DFID-funded T-TEL programme.

As of May 2019, the college is affiliated with the University of Ghana.

History 
Evangelical Presbyterian College of Education (AMECO) was opened on February 10, 1946 with the motto ‘ Education for Service ”. The founding fathers of the College were Mr. W.M. Beveridge, a Scottish missionary, Rev. C.G.Baeta, Rev. R.S. Kwami, Mr. Winfred Addo, Rev. McMillian and Mr. Tom Barton. Members of the teaching staff in 1946 were Mrs. Isa S. Beveridge, Mr. V.O. Anku, Mr. R.Y. Gletsu and Mr. S.K. Agbley. The vision of the College is to position itself to become a reputable College in teacher education, and to be a pace setter in Information Communication Technology education. The College was established with the admission of 30 men. Rev. W.M. Beveridge, was the first principal of the College. In January 1950, the College became a co-educational institution, when it admitted its first batch of 20 female students. AMECO has followed prescribed courses to meet the teacher needs of the country for basic education.

The College has within the sixty years of its existence fulfilled the dreams and aspirations of the founding fathers. AMECO has trained about 6,000 teachers for the nation.

Programmes 
The courses it has provided over the years are;

 two-year post middle Teacher's Certificate ‘A’,
 4-year post middle Teacher's Certificate ‘A’,
 3-year post secondary Teacher's Certificate ‘A’
 3-year post secondary Diploma in Basic Education introduced in October, 2004.
 Specialist programme in Home Science introduced in 1974, but later transferred to Aburi.
 4-year degree in Basic Education introduced in October, 2019

References 

Christian universities and colleges in Ghana
Colleges of Education in Ghana
Education in Volta Region